Stewart Henry Stern (March 22, 1922 – February 2, 2015) was an American screenwriter. He is best known for writing the screenplay for the film Rebel Without a Cause (1955), starring James Dean.

Writing
In addition to Rebel Without a Cause, Stern's most notable screenwriting credits include Sybil, which garnered Emmy awards for both Stern and Sally Field, The Rack starring Paul Newman, The James Dean Story directed by Robert Altman, The Outsider starring Tony Curtis, The Ugly American starring Marlon Brando, Rachel, Rachel starring Joanne Woodward, and The Last Movie directed by Dennis Hopper. He is also author of the book No Tricks in My Pocket: Paul Newman Directs, watching the discovery in Paul Newman's direction for the filming of The Glass Menagerie.

Personal life
Stern was the nephew of Adolph Zukor, founder of Paramount Pictures. In World War II he served as an infantryman, seeing combat in the Battle of the Bulge, for which he was awarded the Bronze Star. His war service left him with permanently numb feet due to frostbite. He was the subject of the documentary Going Through Splat: The Life And Work Of Stewart Stern.

Stern taught a course in Seattle titled "The Personal Connection" at TheFilmSchool. He also taught each year at the Sundance Institute.

Stern died of cancer at the age of 92 in Seattle, Washington.

Filmography

Film
Benjy (1951) (short) – Writer
Teresa (1951) – Writer (screenplay, story)
Rebel Without a Cause (1955) – Writer (screenplay)
The Rack (1956) – Writer (screenplay)
The James Dean Story (1957) – Writer
Thunder in the Sun (1959) – Writer
The Outsider (1961) – Writer
The Ugly American (1963) – Writer (screen story)
Rachel, Rachel (1968) – Writer
The Last Movie (1971) – Writer
Summer Wishes, Winter Dreams (1973) – Writer
Sybil (1976) – Writer (teleplay)
A Christmas to Remember (1978) - WriterActorFright Night'' (1985) - Cook

References

External links
Transcript of letter written by Stewart Stern to the aunt & uncle of James Dean, after Dean's death in 1955 He's here, living and vivid and unforgettable forever
Stewart Stern Interview
Stewart Stern oral history

American male screenwriters
1922 births
2015 deaths
Deaths from cancer in Washington (state)
United States Army personnel of World War II
Jewish American writers
21st-century American Jews